The following lists events that happened during 1997 in the Democratic Republic of the Congo.

Incumbents
 President: Laurent-Désiré Kabila

Events

See also

 1997 in Zaire
 History of the Democratic Republic of the Congo
 First Congo War

References

Sources

1997 in the Democratic Republic of the Congo
Democratic Republic of the Congo
Congo, Democratic Republic